Bicameralism is a type of legislature that is divided into two separate assemblies, chambers, or houses, known as a bicameral legislature. Bicameralism is distinguished from unicameralism, in which all members deliberate and vote as a single group. , roughly 40% of world's national legislatures are bicameral, while unicameralism represents 60% nationally, and much more at the subnational level.

Often, the members of the two chambers are elected or selected by different methods, which vary from jurisdiction to jurisdiction. This can often lead to the two chambers having very different compositions of members.

Enactment of primary legislation often requires a concurrent majority—the approval of a majority of members in each of the chambers of the legislature. When this is the case, the legislature may be called an example of perfect bicameralism. However, in many parliamentary and semi-presidential systems, the house to which the executive is responsible (e.g. House of Commons of UK and National Assembly of France) can overrule the other house (e.g. House of Lords of UK and Senate of France) and may be regarded as an example of imperfect bicameralism. Some legislatures lie in between these two positions, with one house able to overrule the other only under certain circumstances.

History of bicameral legislatures

The British Parliament is often referred to as the "Mother of Parliaments" (in fact a misquotation of John Bright, who remarked in 1865 that "England is the Mother of Parliaments") because the British Parliament has been the model for most other parliamentary systems, and its Acts have created many other parliaments. The origins of British bicameralism can be traced to 1341, when the Commons met separately from the nobility and clergy for the first time, creating what was effectively an Upper Chamber and a Lower Chamber, with the knights and burgesses sitting in the latter. This Upper Chamber became known as the House of Lords from 1544 onward, and the Lower Chamber became known as the House of Commons, collectively known as the Houses of Parliament.

Many nations with parliaments have to some degree emulated the British "three-tier" model. Most countries in Europe and the Commonwealth have similarly organised parliaments with a largely ceremonial head of state who formally opens and closes parliament, a large elected lower house, and (unlike Britain) a smaller upper house.

The Founding Fathers of the United States also favoured a bicameral legislature. The idea was to have the Senate be wealthier and wiser. Benjamin Rush saw this though, and noted that "this type of dominion is almost always connected with opulence". The Senate was created to be a stabilising force, not elected by mass electors, but selected by the State legislators. Senators would be more knowledgeable and more deliberate—a sort of republican nobility—and a counter to what James Madison saw as the "fickleness and passion" that could absorb the House.

He noted further that "The use of the Senate is to consist in its proceeding with more coolness, with more system and with more wisdom, than the popular branch." Madison's argument led the Framers to grant the Senate prerogatives in foreign policy, an area where steadiness, discretion, and caution were deemed especially important. State legislators chose the Senate, and senators had to possess significant property to be deemed worthy and sensible enough for the position. In 1913, the 17th Amendment passed, which mandated choosing Senators by popular vote rather than State legislatures.

As part of the Great Compromise, the Founding Fathers invented a new rationale for bicameralism in which the Senate had an equal number of delegates per state, and the House had representatives by relative populations.

Rationale for bicameralism and criticism

Federal states have often adopted it as an awkward compromise between existing power held equally by each state or territory and a more democratic proportional legislature. For states considering a different constitutional arrangement that may shift power to new groupings, bicameralism could be demanded by currently hegemonic groups who would otherwise prevent any structural shift (e.g. military dictatorships, aristocracies).

The growing awareness of the complexity of the notion of representation and the multi-functional nature of modern legislatures may be affording incipient new rationales for second chambers, though these do generally remain contested institutions in ways that first chambers are not. An example of political controversy regarding a second chamber has been the debate over the powers of the Senate of Canada or the election of the Senate of France. Bicameral legislatures as a result have been trending down for some time with unicameral, proportional legislatures seen as more democratic and effective.

The relationship between the two chambers varies: in some cases, they have equal power, while in others, one chamber (the directly elected lower house with proportional representation) is clearly superior in its powers. The first tends to be the case in federal systems and those with presidential governments. The second tends to be the case in unitary states with parliamentary systems. There are two streams of thought: critics believe bicameralism makes meaningful political reforms more difficult to achieve and increases the risk of gridlock—particularly in cases where both chambers have similar powers—while proponents argue the merits of the "checks and balances" provided by the bicameral model, which they believe help prevent ill-considered legislation.

Communication between houses

Formal communication between houses is by various methods, including:
Sending messages Formal notices, such as of resolutions or the passing of bills, usually done in writing, via the clerk and speaker of each house.
Transmission of bills or amendment to bills requiring agreement from the other house.
Joint session a plenary session of both houses at the same time and place.
Joint committeeswhich may be formed by committees of each house agreeing to join, or by joint resolution of each house. The United States Congress has conference committees to resolve discrepancies between House and Senate versions of a bill, similar to "Conferences" in Westminster parliaments.
ConferencesConferences of the Houses of the English (later British) Parliament met in the Painted Chamber of the Palace of Westminster. Historically there were two distinct types: "ordinary" and "free". The British Parliament last held an ordinary conference in 1860—its elaborate procedure yielding to the simpler sending of messages. A free conference resolves a dispute through "managers" meeting less formally in private. The last free conference at Westminster was in 1836 on an amendment to the Municipal Corporations Act 1835; the previous one had been in 1740—with not much more success than ordinary conferences, the free type yielded to the greater transparency of messages. In the Parliament of Australia there have been two formal conferences, in 1930 and 1931, but many informal conferences.  the "Conference of Managers" remains the usual procedure for dispute resolution in the Parliament of South Australia. In the Parliament of New South Wales in 2011, the Legislative Assembly requested a free conference with the Legislative Council over a bill on graffiti; after a year the Council refused, describing the mechanism as archaic and inappropriate. The two houses of the Parliament of Canada have also used conferences, but not since 1947 (although they retain the option).

Examples of bicameralism at the national level

Federal

Some countries, such as Argentina, Australia, Austria, Belgium, Bosnia and Herzegovina, Brazil, Canada, Germany, India, Malaysia, Mexico, Nepal, Nigeria, Pakistan, Russia, Switzerland, and the United States, link their bicameral systems to their federal political structure.

In the United States, Australia, Mexico, Brazil and Nepal for example, each state or province is given the same number of seats in one of the houses of the legislature, despite variance between the populations of the states or provinces.

Canada

Canada's elected lower house, the House of Commons, comprises Members of Parliament (MPs) from single-member "ridings" based mainly on population (updated every 10 years using Census data). The Commons is democratically elected every four years (constitutionally up to five years). In contrast, in Canada's upper house, Senators are appointed to serve until age 75 by the Governor General on the advice of the Prime Minister through an Independent Advisory Board as of 2016. 

The Government (i.e. executive) is responsible to and must maintain the confidence of the elected House of Commons. Although the two chambers formally have many of the same powers, this accountability clearly makes the Commons dominant—determining which party is in power, approving its proposed budget and (largely) the laws enacted. The Senate primarily acts as a chamber of revision: it almost never rejects bills passed by the Commons but does regularly amend them; such amendments respect each bill's purpose, so they are usually acceptable to the Commons. Occasionally, the two houses cannot come to an agreement on an amendment, which results in rare instances of a key Government bill failing. The Senate's power to investigate issues of concern to Canada can raise their profile (sometimes sharply) on voters' political agendas.

Australia

The bicameral Parliament of Australia consists of two Houses: the lower house is called the House of Representatives and the upper house is named the Senate. As of 31 August 2017, the lower house has 151 members, each elected from single-member constituencies, known as electoral divisions (commonly referred to as "electorates" or "seats") using full-preference instant-runoff voting. This tends to lead to the chamber being dominated by two major groups, the Liberal/National Coalition and the Labor Party. The government of the day must achieve the confidence of this House to gain and hold power.

The upper house, the Senate, is also popularly elected, under the single transferable vote system of proportional representation. There are a total of 76 senators: 12 senators are elected from each of the 6 Australian states (regardless of population) and 2 from each of the 2 autonomous internal territories (the Australian Capital Territory and the Northern Territory). This makes the total number 76, i.e. 6×12 + 2×2.

Unlike upper houses in most Westminster parliamentary systems, the Australian Senate is vested with significant power, including the capacity to block legislation initiated by the government in the House of Representatives, making it a distinctive hybrid of British Westminster bicameralism and US-style bicameralism. As a result of proportional representation, the chamber features a multitude of parties vying for power. The governing party or coalition, which must maintain the confidence of the lower house, rarely has a majority in the Senate and usually needs to negotiate with other parties and Independents to get legislation passed.

Others

In German, Indian, and Pakistani systems, the upper houses (the Bundesrat, the Rajya Sabha, and the Senate respectively) are even more closely linked with the federal system, being appointed or elected directly by the governments or legislatures of each German or Indian state, or Pakistani province. This was also the case in the United States before the Seventeenth Amendment was adopted. Because of this coupling to the executive branch, German legal doctrine does not treat the Bundesrat as the second chamber of a bicameral system formally. Rather, it sees the Bundesrat and the Bundestag as independent constitutional bodies. Only the directly elected Bundestag is considered the parliament. In the German Bundesrat, the various Länder have between three and six votes; thus, while the less populated states have a lower weight, they still have a stronger voting power than would be the case in a system based proportionately on population, as the most populous Land currently has about 27 times the population of the least populous. The Indian upper house does not have the states represented equally, but on the basis of their population.

There is also bicameralism in countries that are not federations, but have upper houses with representation on a territorial basis. For example, in South Africa, the National Council of Provinces (and before 1997, the Senate) has its members chosen by each province's legislature.

In Spain, the Senate functions as a de facto territorially based upper house, and there has been some pressure from the Autonomous Communities to reform it into a strictly territorial chamber.

The European Union maintains a somewhat close to bicameral legislative system consisting of the European Parliament, which is elected in elections on the basis of universal suffrage, and the Council of the European Union, which consists of one representative for each government of member countries, who are competent for a relevant field of legislation. Though the European Union has a highly unusual character in terms of legislature, one could say that the closest point of equivalency lies within bicameral legislatures. The European Union is considered neither a country nor a state, but it enjoys the power to address national Governments in many areas.

Aristocratic and post-aristocratic

In a few countries, bicameralism involves the juxtaposition of democratic and aristocratic elements.

House of Lords of the United Kingdom 

The best known example is the British House of Lords, which includes a number of hereditary peers. The House of Lords is a vestige of the aristocratic system that once predominated in British politics, while the other house, the House of Commons, is entirely elected. Over the years, some have proposed reforms to the House of Lords, some of which have been at least partly successful. The House of Lords Act 1999 limited the number of hereditary peers (as opposed to life peers, appointed by the Monarch on the advice of the Prime Minister) to 92, down from around 700. Of these 92, one is the Earl Marshal, a hereditary office always held by the Duke of Norfolk, one is the Lord Great Chamberlain, a hereditary office held by turns, currently by the Marquess of Cholmondeley, and the other 90 are elected by all sitting peers. Hereditary peers elected by the House to sit as representative peers sit for life; when a representative peer dies, there is a by-election to fill the vacancy. The power of the House of Lords to block legislation is curtailed by the Parliament Acts 1911 and 1949. Peers can introduce bills except Money Bills, and all legislation must be passed by both Houses of Parliament. If not passed within two sessions, the House of Commons can override the Lords' delay by invoking the Parliament Act. Certain legislation, however, must be approved by both Houses without being forced by the Commons under the Parliament Act. These include any bill that would extend the time length of a Parliament, private bills, bills sent to the House of Lords less than one month before the end of a session, and bills that originated in the House of Lords.

Life Peers are appointed either by recommendation of the Appointment Commission (the independent body that vets non-partisan peers, typically from academia, business or culture) or by Dissolution Honours, which take place at the end of every Parliamentary term when leaving MPs may be offered a seat to keep their institutional memory. It is traditional to offer a peerage to every outgoing Speaker of the House of Commons.

Further reform of the Lords has been proposed; however, no proposed reforms have been able to achieve public consensus or government support. Members of the House of Lords all have an aristocratic title, or are from the Clergy. 26 Archbishops and Bishops of the Church of England sit as Lords Spiritual (the Archbishop of Canterbury, Archbishop of York, the Bishop of London, the Bishop of Durham, the Bishop of Winchester and the next 21 longest-serving Bishops). It is usual that retiring Archbishops, and certain other Bishops, are appointed to the Crossbenches and given a life peerage.

Until 2009, 12 Lords of Appeal in Ordinary sat in the House as the highest court in the land; they subsequently became justices of the newly created Supreme Court of the United Kingdom. As of 16 February 2021, 803 people sit in the House of Lords, with 92 Hereditary Peers, 26 Lords Spiritual and 685 Life Peers. Membership is not fixed and decreases only on the death, retirement or resignation of a peer.

Japan's former House of Peers 

Another example of aristocratic bicameralism was the Japanese House of Peers, abolished after World War II and replaced with the present House of Councillors.

Unitary states

Many unitary states like Italy, France, the Netherlands, the Philippines, the Czech Republic, the Republic of Ireland and Romania have bicameral systems. In countries such as these, the upper house generally focuses on scrutinizing and possibly vetoing the decisions of the lower house.

Italian Parliament 

On the other hand, in Italy the Parliament consists of two chambers that have the same role and power: the Senate (Senate of the Republic, commonly considered the upper house) and the Chamber of Deputies (considered the lower house). The main difference among the two chambers is the way the two chambers are composed: the deputies, in fact, are elected on a nationwide basis, whilst the members of the Senate are elected on a regional basis: this may lead to different majorities among the two chambers because, for example, a party may be the first nationally but second or third in some regions. Considering that in the Italian Republic the Government needs to win confidence votes in both the chambers, it may happen that a Government has a strong majority (usually) in the Chamber of Deputies and a weak one (or no majority at all) in the Senate. This has led sometimes to legislative deadlocks, and has caused instability in the Italian Government.

Indirectly elected Upper Houses (France, Ireland, Netherlands) 

In some of these countries, the upper house is indirectly elected. Members of France's Senate and Ireland's Seanad Éireann are chosen by electoral colleges. In Ireland, it consists of members of the lower house, local councillors, the Taoiseach, and graduates of selected universities, while the Netherlands' Senate is chosen by members of provincial assemblies (who, in turn, are directly elected).

Semi-bicameral (Hong Kong, Northern Ireland; earlier in Norway, the Netherlands) 

In Hong Kong, members of the unicameral Legislative Council returned from the democratically elected geographical constituencies and partially democratic functional constituencies are required to vote separately since 1998 on motions, bills or amendments to government bills not introduced by the government. The passage of these motions, bills or amendments to government motions or bills requires double majority in both groups simultaneously. (Before 2004, when elections to the Legislative Council from the Election Committee was abolished, members returned through the Election Committee vote with members returned from geographical constituencies.) The double majority requirement does not apply to motions, bills and amendments introduced by the government.

Another similar situation are cross-community votes in Northern Ireland when the petition of concern procedure is invoked.

Norway had a kind of semi-bicameral legislature with two chambers, or departments, within the same elected body, the Storting. These were called the Odelsting and were abolished after the general election of 2009. According to Morten Søberg, there was a related system in the 1798 constitution of the Batavian Republic.

Examples of bicameralism in subnational entities
In some countries with federal systems, individual states (like those of the United States, Argentina, Australia and India) may also have bicameral legislatures. A few such states as Nebraska in the U.S., Queensland in Australia, Bavaria in Germany, and Tucumán and Córdoba in Argentina have later adopted unicameral systems. (Brazilian states and Canadian provinces all abolished upper houses).

Argentina

Only 8 out of 24 provinces still have bicameral legislatures, with a Senate and a Chamber of Deputies: Buenos Aires, Catamarca, Corrientes, Entre Ríos, Mendoza, Salta, San Luis (since 1987) and Santa Fe. Tucumán and Córdoba changed to unicameral systems in 1990 and 2001 respectively. Santiago del Estero changed to a bicameral legislature in 1884, but changed back to a unicameral system in 1903.

Australia
When the Australian states were founded as British colonies in the 19th century, they each had a bicameral Parliament. The lower house was traditionally elected based on the one-vote-one-value principle, with universal male suffrage, later expanded to women, whereas the upper house was either appointed on the advice of the government or elected, with a strong bias towards country voters and landowners. After Federation, these became the state Parliaments. In Queensland, the appointed upper house was abolished in 1922, while in New South Wales there were similar attempts at abolition, before the upper house was reformed in the 1970s to provide for direct election.

Beginning in the 1970s, Australian states began to reform their upper houses to introduce proportional representation in line with the Federal Senate. The first was the South Australian Legislative Council in 1973, which initially used a party list system (replaced with STV in 1982), followed by the Single Transferable Vote being introduced for the New South Wales Legislative Council in 1978, the Western Australian Legislative Council in 1987 and the Victorian Legislative Council in 2003.

Nowadays, the upper house both federally and in most states is elected using proportional representation while the lower house uses Instant-runoff voting in single member electorates. This is reversed in the state of Tasmania, where proportional representation is used for the lower house and single member electorates for the upper house.

Bosnia and Herzegovina

The Legislature of the Federation of Bosnia and Herzegovina, one of the two entities of Bosnia and Herzegovina, is a bicameral legislative body. The House of Representatives has 98 delegates, elected for four-year terms by proportional representation. The House of Peoples has 58 members, 17 delegates from among each of the constituent peoples of the Federation, and 7 delegates from among the other peoples. Republika Srpska, the other entity, has a unicameral parliament, known as the National Assembly, but there is also a Council of Peoples who is de facto the other legislative house.

India

Only 6 of the 36 states or Union Territories of India have bicameral legislatures, Andhra Pradesh, Bihar, Karnataka, Maharashtra, Telangana and Uttar Pradesh, while the rest all have unicameral legislatures. The lower houses are called Legislative Assemblies, and their members are elected by universal adult suffrage from single-member constituencies in state elections, which are normally held every five years called Vidhana Sabha. In the six states with bicameral legislatures, the upper house is called the Legislative Council (Vidhan Parishad) or Vidhana Parishat, one-third of whose members are elected every two years. Members of the Legislative Council are elected in various ways:

One-third are elected by the members of local bodies in the state such as municipalities, gram panchayats, block development councils and district councils.
One-third are elected by the members of the state's Legislative Assembly from amongst persons who are not members of the State Legislative Assembly.
One-sixth are nominated by the governor of the state from amongst persons having knowledge or practical experience in fields such as literature, science, arts, the co-operative movement and social service.
One-twelfth are elected from special constituencies by persons who are college graduates of three years' standing residing in those constituencies.
One-twelfth are elected by persons engaged for at least three years in teaching in educational institutions within the state not lower than secondary schools, including colleges and universities.

From 1956 to 1958 the Andhra Pradesh Legislature was unicameral. In 1958, when the State Legislative Council was formed, it became bicameral until 1 June 1985 when it was abolished. This continued until March 2007 when the State Legislative Council was reestablished and elections were held for its seats. In Tamil Nadu, a resolution was passed on 14 May 1986 and the state's Legislative Council was dissolved on 1 November 1986. Again on 12 April 2010, a resolution was passed to reestablish the council, but was ultimately unsuccessful. Similarly, the states of Assam, Jammu and Kashmir, Madhya Pradesh, Punjab, and West Bengal have also dissolved the upper houses of their state legislatures.

United States 
During the 1930s, the Legislature of the State of Nebraska was reduced from bicameral to unicameral with the 43 members that once comprised that state's Senate. One of the arguments used to sell the idea at the time to Nebraska voters was that by adopting a unicameral system, the perceived evils of the "conference committee" process would be eliminated.

A conference committee is appointed when the two chambers cannot agree on the same wording of a proposal, and consists of a small number of legislators from each chamber. This tends to place much power in the hands of only a small number of legislators. Whatever legislation, if any, the conference committee finalizes is presented in an unamendable "take-it-or-leave-it" manner by both chambers.

During his term as governor of the State of Minnesota, Jesse Ventura proposed converting the Minnesotan legislature to a single chamber with proportional representation, as a reform that he felt would solve many legislative difficulties and impinge upon legislative corruption. In his book on political issues, Do I Stand Alone?, Ventura argued that bicameral legislatures for provincial and local areas were excessive and unnecessary, and discussed unicameralism as a reform that could address many legislative and budgetary problems for states.

Historical 
The German federal state of Bavaria had a bicameral legislature from 1946 to 1999, when the Senate was abolished by a referendum amending the state's constitution. The other 15 states have used a unicameral system since their founding.

In the Soviet Union, regional and local Soviets were unicameral. After the adoption of the 1993 Russian Constitution, bicameralism was introduced in some regions. Bicameral regional legislatures are still technically allowed by federal law but this clause is dormant now. The last region to switch from bicameralism to unicameralism was Sverdlovsk Oblast in 2012.

Reform

Arab political reform

A 2005 report on democratic reform in the Arab world by the U.S. Council on Foreign Relations co-sponsored by former Secretary of State Madeleine Albright urged Arab states to adopt bicameralism, with upper chambers appointed on a 'specialized basis'. The Council claimed that this would protect against the 'Tyranny of the majority', expressing concerns that without a system of checks and balances extremists would use the single chamber parliaments to restrict the rights of minority groups.

In 2002, Bahrain adopted a bicameral system with an elected lower chamber and an appointed upper house. This led to a boycott of parliamentary elections that year by the Al Wefaq party, who said that the government would use the upper house to veto their plans. Many secular critics of bicameralism were won around to its benefits in 2005, after many MPs in the lower house voted for the introduction of so-called morality police.

Romania

A referendum on introducing a unicameral Parliament instead of the current bicameral Parliament was held in Romania on 22 November 2009. The turnout rate was 50.95%, with 77.78% of "Yes" votes for a unicameral Parliament. This referendum had a consultative role, thus requiring a parliamentary initiative and another referendum to ratify the new proposed changes.

Ivory Coast

A referendum on a new constitution was held on 30 October 2016. The constitution draft would create a bicameral Parliament instead of the current unicameral. The Senate is expected to represent the interests of territorial collectivities and Ivoirians living abroad. Two thirds of the Senate is to be elected at the same time as the general election. The remaining one third is appointed by the president elect.

Examples

Current

Federal

Unitary

Historical

See also

 Federalism
 List of abolished upper houses
 Tricameralism
 Unicameralism

References

Further reading

External links
 Noncontemporaneous Lawmaking: Can the 110th Senate Enact a Bill Passed by the 109th House?, 16 Cornell J.L. & Pub. Pol'y 331 (2007).
 Against Mix-and-Match Lawmaking Aaron-Andrew P. Bruhl, Against Mix-and-Match Lawmaking], 16 Cornell J.L. & Pub. Pol'y 349 (2007).
 Defending the (Not So) Indefensible: A Reply to Professor Aaron-Andrew P. Bruhl, 16 Cornell J.L. & Pub. Pol'y 363 (2007).